Petar Rajič (born 12 June 1959) is a Canadian-Croatian prelate of the  Catholic Church who works in the  diplomatic service of the Holy See. He was named Apostolic Nuncio to Lithuania on 15 June 2019. On 6 August 2019, he was also appointed Apostolic Nuncio to Estonia and Latvia.

Biography
Petar Antun Rajič was born in Toronto to Catholic Liberan and Dominika, Croatian immigrants from Bosnia and Herzegovina to Canada. Petar is the eldest of three children.

On 2 December 2009, Pope Benedict XVI named him titular archbishop of Sarsenterum; Apostolic Nuncio to Kuwait, Bahrain, and Qatar; and Apostolic Delegate to the Arabian Peninsula. On 27 March 2010 he named him nuncio to Yemen and the United Arab Emirates as well.

He is fluent in English, Croatian, French, Italian and Portuguese.

On 15 June 2015, Pope Francis named him nuncio to Angola and São Tomé e Principe.

Pope Francis named him Apostolic Nuncio to Lithuania on 15 June 2019, adding the responsibilities of Nuncio to Estonia and Latvia on 6 August.

See also
 List of heads of the diplomatic missions of the Holy See

References

External links
Catholic Hierarchy: Archbishop Petar Antun Rajič
Apostolic Vicariate of Northern Arabia biography

1959 births
Clergy from Toronto
Croats of Bosnia and Herzegovina
20th-century Canadian Roman Catholic priests
21st-century Roman Catholic titular archbishops
University of Toronto alumni
Living people
Apostolic Nuncios to Kuwait
Apostolic Nuncios to Bahrain
Apostolic Nuncios to Qatar
Apostolic Nuncios to Yemen
Apostolic Nuncios to United Arab Emirates
Apostolic Nuncios to Angola
Apostolic Nuncios to São Tomé and Príncipe
Apostolic Nuncios to Lithuania
Apostolic Nuncios to Estonia
Apostolic Nuncios to Latvia
Bishops of Sarsenterum